"Roar, Lion, Roar" is the primary fight song of Columbia University. It was originally titled "Bold Buccaneers" and was written with different lyrics for the 1923 Varsity Show Half Moon Inn by Columbia undergraduates Corey Ford and Morris W. Watkins, and alumnus Roy Webb. In order to compete in the Columbia Alumni Federation's contest to find a school fight song the same year, Ford wrote a new set of lyrics that would become "Roar, Lion, Roar". The title references Columbia's mascot, the Columbia Lion.

Lyrics 

The original lyrics are:

Today the song is almost always performed with only the second stanza.

"Bold Buccaneers" 

The 1923 Varsity Show, Half Moon Inn, was based on characters from The Sketch Book of Geoffrey Crayon, Gent. by Washington Irving, including Rip Van Winkle and Hendrick Hudson, the historical explorer for whom the Hudson River is named and who discovered Hudson Strait and Hudson Bay on his ship, the Halve Maen ("Half Moon"). The play followed the misadventures of the Columbia crew team, to whom the title "Bold Buccaneers" referred to.

The lyrics for "Bold Buccaneers" are as follows:

Performers
Johnny Long and his Orchestra – College Favorites (Volume 2) (1947)
Lang-Worth Feature Programs (1950?)
Walter Schumann – Songs of the Ivy League (1951)
Charles Henderson Band and Glee Club – Collegiana (1960)
The Kirby Stone Four – Get That Ball (1962)
Annette Funicello (with The Wellingtons) – Annette on Campus (1963)
Norman Luboff Choir – Go, Team, Go! (1964)
William Revelli – Kick Off, U.S.A. (1964)
The Mormon Tabernacle Choir – Hail to the Victors! (1978)

References

External links
Lyrics to song
Lyrics, score, and audio from the Columbia University Library

Ivy League fight songs
Columbia Lions
Culture of Columbia University
American college songs